Dentellaria sloaneana is a species of air-breathing land snail, a terrestrial pulmonate gastropod mollusk in the family Pleurodontidae. 

This species occurs in Jamaica.

References

External links 
 Three views of one shell
 Cockerell, T. D. A. (1892). Additions to the museum. Journal of the Institute of Jamaica. 1(2): 54-56
 Sei M., Robinson D.G., Geneva A.J. & Rosenberg G. (2017). Doubled helix: Sagdoidea is the overlooked sister group of Helicoidea (Mollusca: Gastropoda: Pulmonata). Biological Journal of the Linnean Society. 122(4): 697-728

Pleurodontidae
Gastropods described in 1868